Rodello is a comune (municipality) in the Province of Cuneo in the Italian region Piedmont, located about  southeast of Turin and about  northeast of Cuneo.

Rodello borders the following municipalities: Albaretto della Torre, Benevello, Diano d'Alba, Lequio Berria, Montelupo Albese, and Sinio.

References

Cities and towns in Piedmont